Rudbeckii flickskola ('Rudbeck's Girls' School') also called Pigeskolan ('Maidens' School') and Parthenagogium, was the first school for girls in Sweden.  It was founded in the city of Västerås by the Bishop of Västerås, Johannes Rudbeckius in 1632.

History

Foundation

Johannes Rudbeckius had founded the first Gymnasium (school) for males in 1623.   He had the opinion that females should also be given education, and therefore founded a girls' school in 1632.   The law had already in the Swedish Church Ordinance 1571 stated that girls should receive schooling, but it had left the responsibility to provide schools for them to the responsibility of the local authorities.   In reality no schools had been founded, so this school was the first to implement the law.

Activity

The school was publicly financed and mainly received students from the poor classes and orphans.  It was inaugurated with references to the education of the biblical Susanna.

It provided elementary education and the subjects were reading, writing, Christianity, mathematics and handicrafts.   The staff consisted of the male principal and a female teacher, who was also his wife.  It was under supervision of the bishop, who apparently always had a special interest in its welfare.  

It is not known how long the school lasted, but it is not mentioned after the death of the bishop in 1646, so it may have ended after his death.

Legacy

Though there are examples of individual girls who were allowed to study in schools for boys in Sweden during the 17th-century, no other schools for girls were founded in Sweden until a century later, and no school for girls offered any serious academic education to females until the Societetsskolan in 1787.  

In the city of Västerås specifically, no new school for girls was founded until a student of Cecilia Fryxell, Natalia Andersson, founded her school in 1858.

References

Other sources
 
 Johannes Rudbeckius, urn:sbl:6999, Svenskt biografiskt lexikon (art av Erland Sellberg), hämtad 2014-02-26.
 Kyrkohistorisk Årsskrift / Tjugonde årgången, 1919 / 
 Sveriges historia i sammanhang med Danmarks och Norges: 1611-1718. 3:e uppl. Carl Gustaf Grimberg.
 Studier i den svenska kyrkans syn pa kvinnans stallning i samha...Eva Åsbrink. 1962
 Årsskrift, Volym 57–60. Västmanlands fornminnesförening. 1979
 Teologisk tidskrift, Volym 10
 Den svenska kvinnorörelsen: Historisk översikt. Lydia Wahlström. P. A. Norstedt & söners förlag, 1933 - 339 sidor
 Nordisk familjebok: konversations-lexikon och realencyklopedi ny, Volym 33. Bernhard Meijer. Nordisk familjeboks förlags aktiebolag, 1922
 Sveriges städer nu och fordom: skildringar i ord och bilder, under med verkan av ett stort antal författare, Volym 14–19. P. A. Norstedt & söner, 1915
 Johannes Rudbeckius: en kämpagestalt från Sveriges storhetstid. Henrika Scheffer. 1914
 Nordisk tidskrift för politik, ekonomi och litteratur, Volym 4]
 [http://staff.www.ltu.se/~tomas/KvinnligaMatematiker08/kvinnligamatematikerA.pdf

Educational institutions established in the 1630s
Girls' schools in Sweden
Schools in Sweden
1630s establishments in Sweden
Defunct schools in Sweden